In 2022, the WTA calendar was still being affected by the cancellation of women's professional tennis tournaments in China and Russia due to the COVID-19 pandemic, the Russian invasion of Ukraine, and the allegations of Peng Shuai against Zhang Gaoli and the Chinese Communist Party. As a result, a WTA 1000 tournament was announced to be held in Guadalajara to compensate for it. This was one of the biggest women's tournaments ever hosted by Mexico, held on outdoor hard courts in October 2022.

Champions

Singles 

  Jessica Pegula def.  Maria Sakkari, 6–2, 6–3

This is Pegula's first title of the year and second of her career.

Doubles 

  Storm Sanders /  Luisa Stefani def.  Anna Danilina /  Beatriz Haddad Maia 7–6(7–4), 6–7(2–7), [10–8]

Point distribution

Prize money 

*per team

Singles main-draw entrants

Seeds

† Rankings are as of 10 October 2022.

Other entrants
The following players received wildcards into the main draw:
  Eugenie Bouchard
  Fernanda Contreras Gómez
  Donna Vekić

The following player received entry into the singles main draw with a protected ranking:
  Bianca Andreescu

The following players received entry from the qualifying draw:
  Elisabetta Cocciaretto
  Lauren Davis
  Kayla Day
  Caroline Dolehide
  Magdalena Fręch
  Linda Fruhvirtová
  Rebecca Marino
  Asia Muhammad

The following players received entry as lucky losers:
  Elina Avanesyan
  Nao Hibino
  Laura Pigossi

Withdrawals 
 Before the tournament
  Amanda Anisimova → replaced by  Sloane Stephens
  Sofia Kenin → replaced by  Ann Li
  Anett Kontaveit → replaced by  Anna Kalinskaya
  Petra Martić → replaced by  Magda Linette
  Garbiñe Muguruza → replaced by  Marta Kostyuk
  Shelby Rogers → replaced by  Nao Hibino
  Alison Riske-Amritraj → replaced by  Laura Pigossi
  Zhang Shuai → replaced by  Elina Avanesyan
  Zheng Qinwen → replaced by  Tereza Martincová

Doubles main-draw entrants

Seeds 

 1 Rankings as of 10 October 2022.

Other entrants
The following pairs received wildcards into the doubles main draw:
  Victoria Azarenka  /  Bethanie Mattek-Sands
  Fernanda Contreras Gómez  /  Camila Osorio
  Caroline Dolehide  /  CoCo Vandeweghe

The following pairs received entry as alternates:
  Elisabetta Cocciaretto /  Martina Trevisan
  Marta Kostyuk /  Tereza Martincová

Withdrawals
  Anna Bondár /  Kimberley Zimmermann → replaced by  Nadiia Kichenok /  Kimberley Zimmermann
  Caroline Dolehide /  CoCo Vandeweghe → replaced by  Marta Kostyuk /  Tereza Martincová
  Asia Muhammad /  Zhang Shuai → replaced by  Elisabetta Cocciaretto /  Martina Trevisan

References

External links 
 Official website

2022 WTA Tour
Mexican Open (tennis)
2022 in Mexican tennis
October 2022 sports events in Mexico